Montalbo is a municipality in the province of Cuenca, part of the autonomous community of Castile-La Mancha, in the country of Spain.

References

External links
 Montalbo municipal gov't website

Municipalities in the Province of Cuenca